Bendeleben is a village and a former municipality in the district Kyffhäuserkreis, in Thuringia, Germany. Since 31 December 2012, it is part of the municipality Kyffhäuserland.

Historical Population 

(as of 31 December):

Source: Thuringian State Statistics Office

Gallery

References

Former municipalities in Thuringia
Schwarzburg-Sondershausen